Paul O'Keefe (born April 27, 1951) is an American actor best known for his work as Ross Lane, the younger brother of Patty Duke's character Patty Lane in the television series The Patty Duke Show and for the movie The Daydreamer. Born in Boston, Massachusetts, he began his schooling at the Immaculate Conception School and at the New England Conservatory of Music. He appeared on television with such actors as Sid Caesar, Sarah Vaughan, and Bob Hope. At the age of 7 years, he played Winthrop Paroo in the 1959 musical The Music Man on Broadway. Prior to his engagement for The Music Man, he played Little Jake to Dolores Gray's Annie Get Your Gun at the Carousel Theatre in Framingham, Massachusetts.  

Since the deaths of Jean Byron in 2006 and Patty Duke, William Schallert and Eddie Applegate in 2016, O'Keefe is now the only surviving member of The Patty Duke Shows main cast.

Filmography

References

External links 
 
 

1951 births
Living people
People from Everett, Massachusetts
Male actors from Boston
American male television actors